Brenton McDonald (born 30 April 1984) is an Australian cricketer. He played in two List A matches for South Australia in October 2012. He also played in one match for the Melbourne Renegades in the Big Bash League in 2021.

See also
 List of South Australian representative cricketers

References

External links
 

1984 births
Living people
Australian cricketers
Melbourne Renegades cricketers
South Australia cricketers
Place of birth missing (living people)